Admiral Nakhimov may refer to:
 Russian Admiral Pavel Nakhimov
 Admiral Nakhimov (film), a 1947 Soviet film directed by Vsevolod Pudovkin
 Ships named after the admiral:
 
 , a Russian armoured cruiser 
 Former name of the  
 Admiral Nakhimov, a 
 Admiral Nakhimov, a 
 , formerly Kalinin, a ''Kirov-class battlecruiser